Paul Günther (24 October 1882 – 13 February 1959) was a German diver who competed in the 1912 Summer Olympics. He won the gold medal in the 3 m springboard event. In the plain high diving he competed in the final, but did not finish, so he became eighth. In 1988 he was inducted to the International Swimming Hall of Fame.

See also
 List of members of the International Swimming Hall of Fame

References

1882 births
1959 deaths
German male divers
Divers at the 1912 Summer Olympics
Olympic divers of Germany
Olympic gold medalists for Germany
Olympic medalists in diving
Medalists at the 1912 Summer Olympics
Sportspeople from Hanover
20th-century German people